Charles Edwin Ponting, F.S.A., (1850–1932) was a Gothic Revival architect who practised in Marlborough, Wiltshire.

Career
Ponting began his architectural career in 1864 in the office of the architect Samuel Overton. He was agent for the Meux brewing family's estate from 1870 until 1888. After Admiral Hedworth Meux inherited Theobalds House in Hertfordshire in 1910, Ponting enlarged the house for him.

In 1883 the Diocese of Salisbury appointed Ponting Surveyor of Ecclesiastical Dilapidations for the Archdeaconry of Wiltshire. Part of the Diocese of Bristol was added to his responsibilities in 1887 and the Diocese of Salisbury added the Archdeaconry of Dorset to his duties in 1892. He resigned from his post with the Bristol Diocese in 1915 and from that with the Salisbury Diocese in 1923.

Family
Ponting married Overton's daughter Martha Margaretta in 1872. She died in 1873 at the age of 20 while giving birth to their twin daughters Martha and Mary. Ponting never remarried, and the twins remained unmarried and lived with him until his death.

Works
National School, Overton and Fyfield, Wiltshire, 1875
St. Michael's parish church, West Overton, Wiltshire, 1878
St. Peter ad Vincula parish church, Broad Hinton, Wiltshire: restoration, 1879
All Saints' parish church, Liddington, Wiltshire: restoration, 1880s
St. Matthew's parish church, Mere, Wiltshire, 1882
East Kennett, Wiltshire: village dispensary and parish room, 1884
All Saints' parish church, Marden, Wiltshire: rebuilding, 1885
St. Mary, St. Katherine and All Saints' parish church, Edington, Wiltshire: restoration, 1887
St. Giles' parish church, Stanton St Quintin, Wiltshire: rebuilt chancel, 1888
St. John the Baptist parish church, Yaverland, Isle of Wight: reredos, 1889
St. John the Baptist parish church, Pewsey, Wiltshire: restoration, 1889–90
St. Katherine's parish church, Holt, Wiltshire: rebuilding, 1891
St. Mary's parish church, Almondsbury, Gloucestershire: oak reredos, 1891
St. Andrew's parish church, Rockbourne, Hampshire: restoration, 1893
St. Michael's parish church, Melksham, Wiltshire: oak reredos, 1894
St. Birinus' parish church, Redlynch, Wiltshire: 1894–96
Dauntsey's School, West Lavington, Wiltshire, 1895
All Saints' parish church, Leigh, Wiltshire: relocation & reconstruction, 1896
St. John's parish church, Bemerton, Wiltshire: restoration, 1896
St. John the Evangelist parish church, Ford, North Wiltshire, 1897
St. Michael's parish church, Beer Hackett, Dorset: tower, 1897
Holy Trinity parish church, Bradpole, Dorset: north aisle, 1897
St. Andrew's parish church, West Stafford, Dorset: chancel, 1898
All Saints' parish church, Down Ampney, Gloucestershire: oak reredos, 1899
St. Thomas' parish church, Southwick, Wiltshire: 1899–1904
Marlborough Town Hall, Marlborough, Wiltshire, 1901–02
St. Mary's parish church, Fordingbridge, Hampshire: restoration, 1901–03
St. George's parish church, Bourton, Dorset: tower, 1903–05
St. Mary's parish church, Alton Barnes, Wiltshire: restoration, 1904
Parish church of Christ, Shaw, Wiltshire, 1905
St. Aldhelm's parish church, Sandleheath, Hampshire, 1907
St. Stephen's parish church, Kingston Lacy, Dorset, 1907
Lytes Cary manor house, Somerset: restoration, after 1907
St. Eustace's parish church, Ibberton, Dorset: restoration, 1907–09
St. Martin's church, Chickerell Road, Weymouth, 1908 (now redundant)
Gymnasium, Marlborough College, Wiltshire, 1908
St. Mary's parish church, Gillingham, Dorset: tower remodelling, 1908–09
Theobalds House, Hertfordshire: additions including tower, after 1910
St. Mary the Virgin parish church, West Fordington, Dorchester, Dorset, 1910–12
Christ Church, Bradford on Avon, Wiltshire: southeast chapel, 1919
East Bridgford War Memorial Cross, 1920
St. George's Church, Langham, Gillingham, Dorset: 1921
St. John the Evangelist, Boreham, Warminster, Wiltshire: baptistery, 1925–26
St. Peter's parish church, Dorchester, Dorset: reredos

References

Sources

External links

Gothic Revival architects
English ecclesiastical architects
1850 births
1932 deaths
People from Marlborough, Wiltshire